Havøysund Church is a parish church of the Church of Norway in Måsøy Municipality in Troms og Finnmark county, Norway. It is located in the village of Havøysund on the island of Havøya. It is one of the churches for the Måsøy parish which is part of the Hammerfest prosti (deanery) in the Diocese of Nord-Hålogaland.

Like most other churches in Finnmark, Havøysund church was burned down by the Germans during the evacuation of Finnmark in 1944. The new church was built of whitewashed concrete and dark wooden timbers in a long church style in 1960 using plans drawn up by the architect Esben Poulsson. The altarpiece and pulpit decoration were painted by the artist Terje Grøstad. The church seats about 300 people.

Media gallery

See also
List of churches in Nord-Hålogaland

References

Måsøy
Churches in Finnmark
20th-century Church of Norway church buildings
Churches completed in 1960
1960 establishments in Norway
Long churches in Norway
Concrete churches in Norway